Talisman City is an expansion to the Talisman board game, both produced by Games Workshop.  City requires the original Second Edition board game.  Talisman City is an expansion for the Second Edition of Talisman while Talisman City of Adventure is the expansion for the Third Edition of Talisman.  Like Talisman, Talisman City is no longer published.

Contents

Talisman City contains the following items:
 The Talisman City game board
 72 Talisman City Adventure Cards
 7 Talisman Adventure Cards (to be merged with the Adventure deck from the main game)
3 Talisman Dungeon cards (to be merged with the Dungeon deck from the Talisman Dungeon expansion set)
20 Purchase Cards
10 Spell Cards
5 Loan Cards (for extra gold)
5 Warrant Cards
6 Character Cards
6 Playing Piece Cards
6 Playing Piece Stands
1 Rulebook

Description

The Talisman City expansion replaces the city space in the Outer Region on the Talisman game board.  Within the new city region there are more places to visit and additional items to purchase.  Some new areas to visit include The Town Square, The Armoury, The Anarchist's Guild and Magic Emporium.

Some special rules apply within the city.  The city "has standards to maintain" and does not harbor moneyless people, hence you must always have at least one gold with you at all times.  If you should ever lose all your gold, a warrant for your arrest will be issued.  If the Patrol or Watch (new cards) ever encounter you, you will be arrested and taken prisoner.  In addition, fighting and all its variants (e.g. assassinating) are not tolerated and earn any participants a warrant.

Additional characters
 Minotaur
 Valkyrie
Master Characters
 King's Champion
 High Mage
 Master Thief
 Sheriff

Reception
In the September–October 1989 edition of Games International (Issue 9), Richard Ashley reviewed the expansion set titled Talisman City, and gave it an average rating of 3 out of 5, saying, "If you enjoy Talisman this is well worth adding as it is fun, although I found the rich [characters] had an easier time."

Reviews
Review in Shadis #1

References

External links 
 An HTML version of the Talisman City rules
 A review of Talisman City from BoardGameGeeks.com, with photos of expansion

Talisman (board game)